Nikolaos Spiridon Pettas (born 2 January 1994) is a Greek footballer who last played for Chattanooga Red Wolves SC.

References

External links
 
 

1994 births
Living people
Greek footballers
Greek expatriate footballers
Association football defenders
A.P.S. Zakynthos players
Panachaiki F.C. players
Houston Dutch Lions players
Chattanooga Red Wolves SC players
USL League One players
National Premier Soccer League players
People from Zakynthos
Sportspeople from the Ionian Islands (region)